The FINA 10 km Marathon Swimming World Cup 2009 occurred in 2009, and was the third edition of the 10K-only circuit. The 2009 edition included 13 races. Races are held in open water: generally lakes, rivers or the sea; with prize money and points towards the overall world cup title made available at each location.

Venues and dates

References

See also
 Round Christiansborg Open Water Swim

FINA Marathon Swim World Series
2009 in swimming
Marathon Swimming World Cup
Marathon Swimming World Cup